Bruma is a suburb of Johannesburg, South Africa. In the 1990s Bruma was well known for South Africa's first manmade lake-side shopping centre, and for its popular African curios and crafts market which attracted tourists and day visitors from around the country. As a popular entertainment destination Bruma boasted many activities and a plethora of restaurants and retail stores. Many of South Africa's large restaurant chain stores can find their routes at the then called Fishermans Village. Well remembered restaurants and entertainment venues included Late Night Al's, Norma Jeans Diner, The Grillhouse, Maresol, Helen of Troy, Johnny Rockets, Cocktails and The Magic Company. Other well-known stores were The Spy Shop, Sweets from Heaven, Woolworths Foods, The Swatch Shop, the current Caltex Fuel station and many more.

In 2015, the City of Johannesburg spearheaded the rehabilitation of the Bruma Lake precinct and created a platform for businesses and properties to once again flourish in the Bruma CBD. The new Bruma Lake Park was created and the Bruma bridge refurbished at a cost of R80 million.

Currently Bruma Lifestyle Centre is situated adjacent to the new Bruma Lake Park. Originally a buzzing cosmopolitan retail centre with restaurants, entertainment and shopping the centre deteriorated due to several contributing factors.

Currently plans are underway to develop the existing Bruma Lifestyle Centre. The NEW Bruma centre will be known as CHROMA – meaning colour in Greek. It will depict the beauty of life in South Africa as well as the diversity of cultures in our beautiful country. In addition, the development will boast a new landmark known as the CHROMA TOWER – an African tower of light and colour that will intensify the skyline of Johannesburg. This new and exciting development was announced in conjunction with the launch of the New Bruma Lake Park by COJ in 2016. It was greatly received with overwhelming support.

Geography

Communities
Bruma is a unique location and is known as the gateway to Johannesburg. The Bruma Bridge is a landmark loved by all and sets the tone for this great metropolitan city. Strategically positioned only 10 minutes from the airport and minutes away from Africa's leading shopping centre Eastgate, Bruma is ideally positioned to welcome the world. Bruma's newly formed riverfront park is a one-of-a-kind gem and truly special place.

This residential suburban area is set beautifully against the hillside known as Linksfield Ridge. Bruma also has an abundance of hotels and many regional business headquarters, banks, consulates, motor dealerships and office parks. Bruma also has the well-known Oriental City, a shoppers paradise that evolved from the original Bruma Flea Market to become a centre of bargain buys that has a diversity of products for all.

The neighbouring suburbs include Cyrildene, where a small Chinatown exists, Bedfordview and Kensington.

Economy
The main shopping centre in the area is Eastgate Shopping Centre, which is one of the largest shopping centres in Johannesburg.

Bruma Lake Flea Market, Gauteng

Bruma flea market offers a wide range of arts and crafts from South Africa and other African countries.

There are more than 50 art and craft traders presently operating along Oppenheimer Street, Bruma (opposite McDonald's). A variety of local art and crafts and other African products form the range of attraction for tourists and visitors. There are more than 50 art and craft traders presently operating along Oppenheimer Street, Bruma.

Some of the arts and crafts sold at the market include handmade items such as bead work, wood crafts, wire art, stone sculptures, African clothing and leather souvenirs. The items available at the flea market accommodate all age groups. The traders at the flea market are willing to explain the stories behind each item they are selling. On Tuesdays, the traders attract many visitors from various areas of Gauteng and other provinces for wholesale trade opportunities.

The old Bruma flea market was closed during 2012.

Law and government

Government
The Railway Safety Regulator previously had its head office in Waterview Corner in Bruma.

Infrastructure

Roads
Excellent transport links serve Bruma with the R24 (Gauteng), N12 (South Africa) and N3 Eastern Bypass (South Africa) highways all easily accessible.  The R24 highway leads directly to O.R International Airport, formerly called Johannesburg Airport (approximately a 15 minute drive from Bruma).

References

Johannesburg Region E